Portage Public Schools is a school district located in Portage, Michigan which serves 8647 students in 14 different schools, including 8 elementary, 3 middle, 2 high, and a community high school.  The school began its 99th year of service on September 2, 2008.

Most of Portage is in this district. Additionally the district covers portions of Kalamazoo, Texas Township, and Pavilion Township.

History
Both high schools in the district are certified International Baccalaureate schools.

Schools

High
 Portage Central High School
 Portage Northern High School
 Portage Community High

Middle
 Portage West Middle School
 Portage North Middle School
 Portage Central Middle School

Elementary

 Amberly Elementary School
 Angling Rd. Elementary School
 Central Elementary School
 Haverhill Elementary School
 Lake Center Elementary School
 Moorsbridge Elementary School
 Woodland Elementary School
 12th St. Elementary School

Former 
Lexington Elementary School
Milham Elementary School
Pershing Elementary School
Ramona Lane Elementary School - This building has been demolished.
Waylee Elementary School - Now 12th Street. Building has been repurposed as the Administration and Technology building.

References

External links
 Portage Public Schools Website

School districts in Michigan
Education in Kalamazoo County, Michigan
Education in Kalamazoo, Michigan
School districts established in 1922
1922 establishments in Michigan